Glen Allen is a town located in Fayette and Marion counties in the U.S. state of Alabama. The town incorporated in May 1959. At the 2020 census, the population was 433, down from 510 at the 2010 census. Glen Allen is positioned along the BNSF railway and is near Interstate 22, providing access to multiple expanding industries.

Geography
Glen Allen is located on the border of Fayette and Marion counties at  (33.899470, -87.730388). It is bordered to the west by the city of Winfield.

Demographics

As of the census of 2010 there were 510 people, 377 households, and 327 families residing in the town. The racial makeup of the town was 83.03% White, 15.61% Black or African American, 0.68% Asian, 0.45% from other races, and 0.23% from two or more races. 1.36% of the population were Hispanic or Latino of any race.

There were 377 households, out of which 32.2% had children under the age of 18 living with them, 62.1% were married couples living together, 5.6% had a female householder with no husband present, and 27.7% were non-families. 27.1% of all households were made up of individuals, and 14.1% had someone living alone who was 65 years of age or older. The average household size was 2.50 and the average family size was 2.99.

In the town, the population was spread out, with 24.2% under the age of 18, 10.0% from 18 to 24, 27.1% from 25 to 44, 27.8% from 45 to 64, and 10.9% who were 65 years of age or older. The median age was 37 years. For every 100 females, there were 91.3 males. For every 100 females age 18 and over, there were 89.3 males.

The median income for a household in the town was $26,827, and the median income for a family was $36,875. Males had a median income of $24,531 versus $19,063 for females. The per capita income for the town was $17,877. About 12.6% of families and 19.3% of the population were below the poverty line, including 21.5% of those under age 18 and 11.3% of those age 65 or over.

Education
Hubbertville School, a PK-12 unit school, is located in the southern portion of the town.

Governance
The town is governed by a mayor and city council. The corporate limits of Glen Allen include the communities of Hubbertville and Bazemore.

References 

Towns in Fayette County, Alabama
Towns in Marion County, Alabama
Towns in Alabama